Te Atatū Peninsula (formerly Te Atatu North) is a waterfront suburb of West Auckland surrounded by the Waitematā Harbour. The area was home to brickworks and farmland until the Northwestern Motorway was constructed in the 1950s, after which Te Atatū developed a low and medium-cost suburb. The area south of the motorway became known as Te Atatū South. The Auckland Harbour Board intended to develop a port on the peninsula for much of the 20th century. After plans for this were abandoned, the land was redeveloped into Footrot Flats Fun Park, an amusement park which operated in the 1980s. During the late 2010s, large-scale housing intensification led to the population of Te Atatū greatly expanding.

Geography and geological history 

The Te Atatū Peninsula is approximately four kilometres in length and two kilometres in width, and is surrounded by the Waitematā Harbour. The peninsula is composed of Waitemata Sandstone, which formed on the ocean floor 20 million years ago, overlayed with alluvial soil from ancient waterways. The peninsula is bound on the west by the Te Wai-o-Pareira / Henderson Creek and to the east by the Whau River, both of which are drowned valleys. During the Last Glacial Period approximately 17,000 years ago, sea levels were significantly lower, and the peninsula was a highland above the Waitematā river valley. The modern peninsula formed approximately 6,500 years ago, when sea levels rose and the Waitematā river valley drowned and became a harbour.

The peninsula is located in the Tāmaki Ecological District. Within this, the majority of the peninsula is a part of the Warm Lowlands Ecosystem, which was originally dominated by a forest of kauri, rimu, rātā, kahikatea and rewarewa trees. The northern end of the peninsula, and the south-western area adjacent to Te Wai-o-Pareira / Henderson Creek has a Harbour Coastline Ecosystem, which was originally a diverse lowland forest, including trees such as pōhutukawa, pūriri, nīkau palms, mamangi and kōwhai.

The saltmarsh on the eastern side of the peninsula is an ecologically significant area for native plant life and bird species, and links to the Motu Manawa (Pollen Island) Marine Reserve to the south-east.

History

Early history 

The peninsula is within the traditional rohe of Te Kawerau ā Maki, and has traditional significance to Ngāti Whātua Ōrākei. Rangihina was the wife of Te Au o Te Whenua, a prominent paramount chief of Te Kawerau ā Maki. To the south-east of the peninsula is Te Tōanga Waka, the Whau River portage, which allowed canoes to pass between the Waitematā Harbour and the Manukau Harbour.

Thomas Henderson, a Scottish immigrant who purchased land from Ngati Whatua in 1844, and established a timber mill on the banks of Te Wai-o-Pareira / Henderson Creek circa 1847 (at the modern suburb of Henderson) to process kauri logs. Te Atatū Peninsula was known as Henderson Point during this period.

In the 1880s, Te Atatū Peninsula was cleared of vegetation, and developed into farmland.  The north-western side of the peninsula was a site where Māori farmers grew potatoes, kūmara (sweet potatoes), and dug for kauri gum during the 19th century. The rua (storage pits) made by the farmers for potatoes gave rise to the name "The Pits", a colloquial name given to the peninsula by European settlers.

On 12 March 1894, Henderson Point was subdivided and sold as the Henderson Mill Estate. Many of the purchasers of the land parcels were the Māori families who had lived in the area. In the early 1900s, the area was renamed Te Atatū ("the dawn") by Reverend Thomas Jackson Bennett (father of Frederick Bennett), referencing the morning sunrise views of the Waitematā Harbour seen from the peninsula. In the late 19th and early 20th centuries, Te Atatū was the location of two brick and pottery yards adjacent to Te Wai-o-Pareira / Henderson Creek and one on the Whau River, however the major brick industries in West Auckland were located to the south, closer to New Lynn. The Henderson Brick and Tile Syndicate operated between 1903 and 1912 at end of Wharf Road, and produced distinctive bricks with backwards "S" design. The other brickworks on the peninsula were Hartshorn Brickworks (1895–1917) and the Auckland Brick and Tile Company on the Whau River (1884–1886).

After the closure of the brickworks, the peninsula was primarily used as farmland, producing dairy, pigs, poultry and fruit from small orchards for the city of Auckland. During World War II, gun emplacements were installed on the eastern side of the peninsula, to protect the RNZAF Base Auckland at Hobsonville from attack.

Ports and suburban development 

During the 1940s, the Auckland Harbour Board proposed that a new port be constructed in the upper Waitematā Harbour, to relieve pressure from the Port of Auckland. In the early 1950s under the Public Works Act, the board acquired Motumānawa / Pollen Island, and 162 hectares of eastern Te Atatū. During the same period, the construction of the Northwestern Motorway led to suburban development of the peninsula, beginning with the Ramlea Park Estate, which was constructed in the early 1950s on the former farm of John Thomas. The motorway split the peninsula into two areas: Te Atatū North (now known as Te Atatū Peninsula) and Te Atatū South.

The population of the area boomed, as the area was seen as inexpensive and accessible to the rest of Auckland. The peninsula was split into two major areas: the west, which became suburban housing, and the east, which was land earmarked for industrial land and the development of the port. Between 1945 and 1960, Te Atatū was the second fastest growing area in Auckland. During this period, the area gained the nickname Nappy Valley, referring to the large number of young families who settled in the area. The new working class suburb was a popular place for Urban Māori, Pākehā and Pasifika families, however the area had poor infrastructure to serve the area's new inhabitants. Low and medium-income housing continued to be built on the peninsula during the 1960s and 1970s.

In the late 1960s, Te Atatū Peninsula was the proposed site for Auckland Thermal No. 1, a large gas-fired power plant that was intended to make the Auckland power grid more resilient. There was wide-scale opposition to the plan, with over 1,000 people present at a meeting at Te Atatū Intermediate School in 1973, after which Prime Minister Norman Kirk announced that the project would be abandoned.

Amusement park 

In the early 1980s, the Auckland Harbour Board abandoned its plans for a port or industrial park on the peninsula. This was formalised by an act of parliament, the Auckland Harbour Board and Waitemata City Council (Te Atatu) Empowering Act 1983, which freed up use of the land for non-industrial purposes. In 1982, Leisureland (later known as the Footrot Flats Fun Park) opened, alongside other ventures such as the Te Atatu Grand Prix Minicar Park. The mayor of Waitemata City, Tim Shadbolt, was a fan of the complex, and wanted the Waitemata City Council to further develop the peninsula into a major entertainment district in order to attract more rates for the council. This scheme included conference centres and Kiwidome, a proposed stadium adjacent to Te Wai-o-Pareira / Henderson Creek. Due to financial difficulties, the park stopped operating in 1989, and was formally shut down by the Waitakere City Council in 1991.

The name "Te Atatū Peninsula" was put forward by Emi Groot in the 1980s and officially adopted by the New Zealand Geographic Board on 5 May 1994, and was formally adopted by the Waitakere Council in 1997. "Te Atatu North" is still commonly used, particularly by older generations.

Intensification and developments 

Te Atatū Peninsula saw a second major period of growth during the late 2010s, after changes to the Auckland Unitary Plan led to major intensive townhouse developments in the suburb. In 2024, construction will begin on the Te Atatū busway station, a planned stop on the Northwestern Busway, connecting Westgate to the Auckland City Centre along the Northwestern Motorway. An urban marae is planned to be developed at the Harbourview-Orangihina Park. The Auckland Council plans to revegetate the Harbourview-Orangihina Park with native plants, and to create a network of walking and cycling paths along the western shores of the Whau River.

Demographics

Te Atatū Peninsula had a population of 13,344 at the 2018 New Zealand census, an increase of 858 people (6.9%) since the 2013 census, and an increase of 1,656 people (14.2%) since the 2006 census. There were 4,353 households, comprising 6,525 males and 6,816 females, giving a sex ratio of 0.96 males per female, with 3,120 people (23.4%) aged under 15 years, 2,361 (17.7%) aged 15 to 29, 6,339 (47.5%) aged 30 to 64, and 1,524 (11.4%) aged 65 or older.

Ethnicities were 65.0% European/Pākehā, 19.6% Māori, 14.9% Pacific peoples, 17.8% Asian, and 3.1% other ethnicities. People may identify with more than one ethnicity.

The percentage of people born overseas was 28.2, compared with 27.1% nationally.

Although some people chose not to answer the census's question about religious affiliation, 50.6% had no religion, 35.6% were Christian, 1.3% had Māori religious beliefs, 2.3% were Hindu, 1.5% were Muslim, 1.4% were Buddhist and 1.6% had other religions.

Of those at least 15 years old, 2,802 (27.4%) people had a bachelor's or higher degree, and 1,557 (15.2%) people had no formal qualifications. 2,352 people (23.0%) earned over $70,000 compared to 17.2% nationally. The employment status of those at least 15 was that 5,532 (54.1%) people were employed full-time, 1,341 (13.1%) were part-time, and 417 (4.1%) were unemployed.

Schools 

Rutherford College, named after Ernest Rutherford, is a secondary (years 9–13) school with a roll of  students. Te Atatū Intermediate School is for years 7–8, and has a roll of  students.

All schools are coeducational. Rolls are as of

Parks and reserves 

Te Atatū Peninsula has several parks and reserves, from Taipari Strand on the western point (with a boat ramp, rowing club and canoe club) to the 85-hectare Harbour View-Orangihina Park on the eastern point (with middens from early Maori occupation, World War II gun emplacements, specially created wetlands, and views over the Waitemata Harbour to Auckland city, the Harbour Bridge and Rangitoto Island). From Orangihina it is possible to walk around the coast via the Te Atatū Walkway to the northern tip of the peninsula, where the Taikata Sailing Club is located. There are also a number of inland parks, the largest of which is Te Atatū Peninsula Park, a large playing field surrounded by a cycleway.

Sports 
Te Atatū is home to several sports clubs. Perhaps the most successful is the Te Atatu Roosters rugby league team who were national champions in 1988. They are based at Jack Colvin Park. Other teams who play in the Te Atatū area are the Te Atatū Tennis Club, Waitakere Cricket Club, Waitakere rugby union club, Waitemata Football Club, Te Atatū Football Club, West City Baseball Club, Te Atatū softball club, Waitemata Rowing Club, and Te Atatū Boating Club.

Local government

From 1876 until 1974, Te Atatū Peninsula was administered by the Waitemata County, a large rural county north and west of the city of Auckland. In 1974, Swanson became a part of the Waitemata City, an area which covered most of West Auckland, excluding the boroughs of Henderson, Glen Eden and New Lynn. With the 1989 local government reforms, the Waitemata City merged with these boroughs to form Waitakere City, and in November 2010, all cities and districts of the Auckland Region were amalgamated into a single body, governed by the Auckland Council.

Te Atatū Peninsula is in the Henderson-Massey local board area. The residents of Henderson-Massey elect a local board, and two councillors from the Waitākere ward to sit on the Auckland Council.

References

Print references

External links 
Photographs of Te Atatu Peninsula held in Auckland Libraries' heritage collections.

Suburbs of Auckland
Henderson-Massey Local Board Area
Populated places around the Waitematā Harbour
West Auckland, New Zealand